The Book of Truth is the debut studio album by Swedish death metal band Ceremonial Oath. The album was released in 1993 through Modern Primitive Records.

Track listing
 "Prologue: Sworn to Avenge" – 1:04  
 "Chapter I: The Invocator" – 3:16
 "Chapter II: For I Have Sinned - The Praise" – 5:24
 "Chapter III: Enthroned" – 5:16
 "Chapter IV: Only Evil Prevails" – 5:30
 "Chapter V: Thunderworld" – 2:26
 "Chapter VI: Lords of Twilight" – 5:42
 "Chapter VII: Ceremonial Oath" – 7:34
 "Chapter VIII: The Lost Name of God" – 3:52
 "Chapter IX: The Book of Truth" – 1:51
 "Chapter X: Hellbound" – 3:40

Credits
'''Ceremonial Oath
Oscar Dronjak - vocals, guitar
Anders Iwers - guitar
Jesper Strömblad - bass guitar
Markus Nordsberg - drums, percussion

1993 debut albums
Ceremonial Oath albums
Albums recorded at Studio Fredman
Albums produced by Fredrik Nordström